Alan Corcoran (born 1989) is an Irish hurler who plays as a left corner-back for the Carlow senior team.

Born in Bagenalstown, County Carlow, Corcoran first played competitive hurling during his schooling at Presentation De La Salle. He arrived on the inter-county scene at the age of seventeen when he first linked up with the Carlow minor team before later joining the under-21 side. He made his senior debut during the 2011 league. Corcoran has since become a regular member of the starting fifteen.

At club level Corcoran plays with Erin's Own.

Honours

Player

Carlow
 All-Ireland Under 21 B Hurling Championship (1): 2008
 Leinster Under-21 A Hurling Championship (1): 2008

References

1989 births
Living people
Erin's Own (Carlow) hurlers
Carlow inter-county hurlers